The 1962 Detroit Lions season was the 33rd season in franchise history. In one of the best regular seasons in their history, the Lions posted an 11–3 record, but finished two games behind the eventual NFL champion Green Bay Packers in the NFL Western Conference. It was the third straight season the Lions finished as runner-up to the Packers in the West. Entering the final weekend, Detroit was one game behind and had won seven consecutive, but were shut out 3–0 by the Chicago Bears. The Lions' three losses, all on the road, were by a total of eight points.

As conference runner-up, Detroit won their third consecutive Playoff Bowl game over the Pittsburgh Steelers, 17–10. The third place game was played at the Orange Bowl in Miami on January 6, three weeks after the end of the regular season.

The Lions never trailed by more than seven points at any point in any game during the season, a feat that was not repeated for 48 years. Their 26–14 win over the Packers
on Thanksgiving Day in Week 11 denied defending champion Green Bay the NFL's first true perfect season. The Lions were up 26–0 in the fourth quarter before Green Bay scored two touchdowns; the Packers had won the first meeting 9–7 in the mud in Green Bay with a late field goal on October 7.

Offseason

NFL Draft

Regular season

Schedule 

Note: Intra-conference opponents are in bold text.

Season summary

Week 4 at Packers 

Alex Karras reportedly threw a helmet at Milt Plum in the locker after the game for throwing the late interception that led to the Lions' defeat.

Week 11 vs. Packers 

The game was dubbed the "Thanksgiving Day Massacre" thanks to the dominant performance of the Lions defense, who sacked Bart Starr 11 times. It was Green Bay's sole loss of the season; they repeated as NFL champions.

Standings

Roster

Playoff Bowl 

The game matched the conference runners-up for third place in the league and was played three weeks after the end of the regular season (and a week after the championship game). The ten editions of the Playoff Bowl, all held at the Orange Bowl in Miami, Florida, are now considered exhibition games by the NFL, not post-season contests.

Awards and records 
 The Lions were only the third NFL team since  that never trailed by more than 7 points at any time during the season. This feat was not repeated until the Green Bay Packers did so in their Super Bowl-winning 2010 season.

See also 
 1962 in Michigan

References

External links 
 Detroit Lions on Pro Football Reference
 Detroit Lions on jt-sw.com
 Detroit Lions on The Football Database

Detroit Lions
Detroit Lions seasons
Detroit Lions